Warrenton Historic District is a national historic district located at Warrenton, Fauquier County, Virginia.  It encompasses 288 contributing buildings in the central business district and surrounding residential areas of the county seat of Warrenton. Notable buildings include the old Fauquier County courthouse (1890), Fauquier County Administration Building (1928), the former Fauquier County Public Library (1923), Fauquier National Bank (1925), "Paradise" (1758), the Thomas L. Moore House (1816), the James Caldwell House (1831), the John Quincy Marr House (1830), the Marshall Building (c. 1820), the California Building (c. 1850), old Town Hall (1854), Warrenton Presbyterian Church (1855), Ullman's Store, and "Mecca" (1859).  Also located on the district are the separately listed Brentmoor and Old Fauquier County Jail.

It was listed on the National Register of Historic Places in 1972.

The nonprofit Experience Old Town Warrenton is an accredited organization by the National Main Street Program, located in the Warrenton Historic District. The nonprofit's mission is to foster and inspire an environment in Old Town Warrenton that enhances economic vitality while preserving the historic character of the community; and to promote a rich and appealing cultural atmosphere to live, play and do business.

Gallery

References

Historic districts in Fauquier County, Virginia
Georgian Revival architecture in Virginia
National Register of Historic Places in Fauquier County, Virginia
Historic districts on the National Register of Historic Places in Virginia